The 2018 Campeonato Carioca de Futebol was the 115th edition of the top tier of football  of FFERJ (Federação de Futebol do Estado do Rio de Janeiro, or Rio de Janeiro State Football Federation). The top four teams in the final standings of the tournament not otherwise qualified competed in the 2019 Copa do Brasil. The top three teams not competing in any level of the national Campeonato Brasileiro qualified for the 2019 Brasileiro Série D. 

The format remained unchanged from the 2017 edition. In the First Round, six teams played a round-robin tournament, with the top two teams qualified for the main competition and the bottom four entering the Relegation Round. The main competition was divided into two tournaments, the Taça Guanabara and Taça Rio, each with two 6-team groups. The top two placed teams in each of the groups qualified to contest the state title. The top four teams in the final standings qualified automatically for the Final Round (the Taça Guanabara and Taça Rio champions). The Final Round was a knockout-style playoff with a two-legged final played at the Maracanã Stadium. in Macaé was punished with the loss of 26 points by TJD-RJ by irregular escalation of left-side Luke Gabriel in six matches of the Taça Rio.

Participating teams

First round
The First Round was contested in a round-robin format from 20 December 2017 to 13 January 2018 by six teams: the two final teams from the 2017 Campeonato Carioca Série B1 (Goytacaz and America), the bottom two teams from the 2017 Campeonato Carioca main competition (Resende and Macaé), and the two surviving teams from the 2017 Campeonato Carioca Relegation Round (Cabofriense and Bonsucesso). The two top placed teams qualified to contest 2018 Campeonato Carioca, one team each placed in Group A and Group B. The remaining four teams contested in the 2018 Relegation Round.

Championship round
The Championship Round was two competitions: Taça Guanabara and Taça Rio. The twelve clubs were  into two groups of six, Group A and Group B. The traditional "big four" teams of Rio de Janeiro (Flamengo, Botafogo, Fluminense, and Vasco da Gama) were separated with two teams placed in each group. Each round had its own four-team playoff featuring the top two teams of each group. The Taça Rio was followed by a four-team Final playoff featuring the top four teams of the combined table across both competitions (the competition playoff champion(s) automatically qualified for the Final playoff).

Taça Guanabara 
The Taça Guanabara was played from 16 January 2018 to 4 February 2018. It was a single round-robin format with each team playing one match with the teams of their own group. The two top point teams qualified for the knockout stage of the competition. The champion of Taça Guanabara qualified to the Final Stage.

Knockout stage

Semi-finals

Final

Taça Rio 
The Taça Rio tournament was from 19 February 2018 to 18 March 2018. Group A and Group B remained the same as in Taça Guanabara, but each team played a single match round-robin against the teams of the other group. The top two teams in points in each group qualified for the knockout stage of the competition. The champion of Taça Rio qualified to the Final Stage.

Knockout stage

Semi-finals

Final

Relegation playoffs 
The Relegation Round was played from 20 January 2018 to 4 March 2018 in a double round-robin format. The two top placed teams qualified for the First Round of the 2019 Campeonato Carioca and the two placed bottom teams were relegated to the 2019 Campeonato Carioca Série B1.

Overall table

Final stage

Semi-finals

Final

Awards

Team of the year

Top scorers

References

Campeonato Carioca seasons
Carioca